Stop The Robberies, Enjoy Safe Streets (STRESS) was a Detroit Police Department unit that operated from 1971 until 1974.

STRESS was created to reduce crime in Detroit. It used decoy units, targeting African-American men. It led to the deaths of twenty-four men, twenty-two of them African-American, over the course of three and a half years.

Notes

External links
World Socialist Web Site
Detroit Historical Society

Police brutality in the United States
Detroit Police Department
1970s in Michigan
1971 in Detroit
1974 in Detroit